The Saint and Her Fool (German: Die Heilige und ihr Narr) is a 1928 German silent drama film directed by William Dieterle and starring Dieterle, Lien Deyers and Gina Manès. It was based on a novel by Agnes Günther and premiered at the Capital am Zoo in Berlin. Art direction was by Andrej Andrejew. For a long time, the movie was considered lost. Although never released in the US, a nitrate copy was discovered in Jack Warner's personal vault. In 2008 it was given to the UCLA in Los Angeles and restored.

It was remade twice into a 1935 German film directed by Hans Deppe and a 1957 Austrian film directed by Gustav Ucicky.

Cast
 William Dieterle as Harro, Graf von Torstein 
 Lien Deyers as Rosemarie von Brauneck 
 Gina Manès as Fürstin von Brauneck 
 Félix P. Soler as Fürst von Brauneck 
 Camilla von Hollay as Fräulein Braun 
 Mathilde Sussin as Frau von Hardenstein 
 Heinrich Gotho as Märt 
 Sophie Pagay as Tante Uli 
 Auguste Prasch-Grevenberg as Tante Marga 
 Hanni Reinwald as Lisa, Rosemaries Zofe 
 Loni Nest as Rosemarie als Kind

References

Bibliography
 Kreimeier, Klaus. The Ufa Story: A History of Germany's Greatest Film Company, 1918-1945. University of California Press, 1999.

External links

1928 films
Films of the Weimar Republic
1928 drama films
German silent feature films
German drama films
Films directed by William Dieterle
Films based on German novels
1920s rediscovered films
German black-and-white films
Rediscovered German films
Silent drama films
1920s German films